Chelis variabilis is a moth in the family Erebidae. It was described by Franz Daniel in 1966. It is found in the Pamir Mountains of Tajikistan.

This species was moved from the genus Palearctia to Chelis as a result of phylogenetic research published in 2016.

References

Moths described in 1966
Arctiina